Thomas Marbory Antonsen (born 7 December 1950) is an American physicist, a Distinguished Professor in the Department of Physics and the Department of Electrical and Computer Engineering at the University of Maryland, Potomac, MD

He graduated from Cornell University wth a B.S. degree in electrical engineering in 1973, an M.S. in 1976 and a Ph.D. in 1977.

He was a National Research Council postdoctoral fellow at the Naval Research Laboratory in 1976-77 and a research scientist in the Research Laboratory of Electronics at MIT from 1977 to 1980. He joined the faculty of the University of Maryland in 1980 as a research assistant, where his research interests include nonlinear dynamics and chaos and plasma theory. He was appointed professor at Maryland in 1989.

He was named a Fellow of the Institute of Electrical and Electronics Engineers (IEEE) in 2012 for contributions to the theory of magnetically confined plasmas, laser-plasma interactions and high power coherent radiation sources and then a Fellow of the American Physical Society in 1986 for contributions to the theory of the stability of high temperature plasmas and the theory of the production of intense ion beams".

He is the 2016 recipient of the John Pierce Award for Excellence in Vacuum Electronics.

He is married with 3 children.

References 

1950 births
Living people
Cornell University alumni
Fellow Members of the IEEE
University of Maryland, College Park faculty
Fellows of the American Physical Society
American electrical engineers